Bob Campbell (6 September 1868 – 1 June 1946) was an Australian rules footballer who played with St Kilda in the Victorian Football League (VFL).

References

External links 

1868 births
1946 deaths
Australian rules footballers from Victoria (Australia)
St Kilda Football Club players
People from Kyneton